Donald Marek Snelten (born May 29, 1992) is an American professional baseball pitcher in the New York Yankees organization. He previously played in Major League Baseball (MLB) for the San Francisco Giants.

Career

Amateur
Snelten attended Lakes Community High School in Lake Villa, Illinois. He was drafted by the San Diego Padres in the 30th round of the 2010 Major League Baseball Draft, but did not sign and played college baseball at the University of Minnesota. In 2011, he briefly played collegiate summer baseball with the Cotuit Kettleers of the Cape Cod Baseball League. After his junior season, he was drafted by the San Francisco Giants in the ninth round of the 2013 MLB Draft.

San Francisco Giants

Snelten signed and spent 2013 with the AZL Giants, going 3–1 with a 1.57 ERA in 34.1 innings. He spent 2014 with the Salem-Keizer Volcanoes and Augusta Greenjackets, posting a combined 4–1 record and 2.56 ERA in 29 relief appearances, and 2015 with the San Jose Giants and Augusta, pitching to a combined 5–11 record and 3.44 ERA in 23 total starts between the two teams. In 2016, he pitched for San Jose, going 4–7 with a 4.11 ERA in 31 games (13 starts), and in 2017, he played for the Richmond Flying Squirrels and Sacramento River Cats where he went 8–1 with a 2.20 ERA  and 1.09 WHIP in 51 appearances out of the bullpen. After the season, he played in the Arizona Fall League. The Giants added him to their 40-man roster after the 2017 season.

Snelten began 2018 with Sacramento. On April 28, 2018, the Giants called up Snelten ahead of a double-header and he made his major league debut in the second game. He was optioned back to Sacramento on May 8 and designated for assignment on May 28.

Baltimore Orioles
Snelten was claimed off waivers by the Baltimore Orioles on June 4, 2018. He was released on March 25, 2019.

Chicago Dogs
On April 15, 2019, Snelten signed with the Chicago Dogs of the independent American Association.

Tampa Bay Rays 
On December 29, 2019, Snelten signed with the Tampa Bay Rays, getting exposure after throwing 99 mph in viral videos seen on Rob Friedman's FlatGround Twitter account. He became a free agent on November 2, 2020.

Chicago Cubs
On November 19, 2020, Snelten signed a minor league contract with the Chicago Cubs organization.

New York Yankees
On August 5, 2022, Snelten signed a minor league deal with the New York Yankees.

References

External links

1992 births
Living people
Baseball players from Illinois
Major League Baseball pitchers
San Francisco Giants players
Minnesota Golden Gophers baseball players
Cotuit Kettleers players
Arizona League Giants players
Salem-Keizer Volcanoes players
Augusta GreenJackets players
San Jose Giants players
Richmond Flying Squirrels players
Sacramento River Cats players
Scottsdale Scorpions players
Chicago Dogs players
Rochester Honkers players